Sri Mohamad Darojatim (born 6 July 1957) is a former rear admiral in the Indonesian Navy who served as its Chief of Staff (Indonesian: Kepala Pelaksanan Harian) to the Bakorkamla in the navy.

Career 
He graduated from the Naval Academy on 6 July 1957. Since being appointed as a Navy officer with the rank of Second Lieutenant, Darojatim has served various assignments both on warships and on staff. 

Military education that has been followed apart from AAL is the Youth Officers Course (1982), Electronic Warfare Course (Royal Navy) at Portsmouth-UK (1985), Helicopter Controller Course (Royal Navy), Portland-UK (1985), Dikspespa Kom (1987/ 1988), Diklapa II Koum (1990/1991), Marine Inspection Course (1991), Seskoal class-34 (1996/1997), Sesko TNI Batch-29 (2002), and Lemhannas PPRA batch-41 (2008).

His assignment began in 1982-1991 as a Navy officer on the Satban and Satkorarmatim ships. Then from 1991 to 2001, he served as Commander of KRI Sungai Gerong, Commander of KRI Rakata, Commander of KRI Ajak, Commander of KRI Mandau, Commander of KRI Badik, Commander of KRI Malahayati and Commander of KRI Yos Sudarso.

On Friday, 23 May 2014, the handover ceremony for the position of Pangarmatim from Rear Admiral Agung Pramono to Rear Admiral Sri Mohamad Darojatim was held at the Koarmatim Pier, Ujung Surabaya, Friday, with the Inspector of Ceremonies (Irup) Chief of Naval Staff (Kasal) Admiral dr. Marsetio.

Awards 

 Bintang Yudha Dharma Nararya

 Bintang Jalasena Pratama

 Bintang Jalasena Nararya

 Satyalancana Seroja

 Satyalancana Kesetiaan 24 years' service

 Satyalancana Kesetiaan 16 years' service

 Satyalancana Kesetiaan 8 years' service

 Satyalancana Dwidya Sistha

 Satyalancana Kebhaktian Sosial

 Satyalancana Dharma Nusa

 Satyalancana Wira Karya

 Satyalancana Wira Dharma

 Satyalancana Dharma Samudra

Position 

 Commander of KRI Sungai Gerong
 Commander of KRI Rakata
 Commander of KRI Ajak
 Commander of KRI Mandau
 Commander of KRI Badik
 Commander of KRI Malahayati
 Commander of KRI Yos Sudarso
 Asops Danguskamlabar (2001)
 Commander of the Fast Ship Squadron, Flotila I Koarmatim (2002)
 Expert Staff of Pangarmatim “B” Komsos (2002)
 Head of Yudha Sports Center (Kapusoyu) Seskoal (2002)
 Commander of the Koarmatim Fast Ship Flotila (2003)
 Assistant Operations Commander of the Military Cross-Sea Command (2004)
 Assistant Operations Commander of the Indonesian Fleet Command for Eastern Region (2005)
 Assistant Officer II Operations (Paban II Ops) Kasal Operations Staff (2005)
 Commander of the Sigma Corvette Task Force in the Netherlands (2005)
 Deputy Governor of the Naval Academy (2007)
 Commander of the Koarmatim Marine Combat Group (2008)
 Deputy Assistant Planning and Cash Budget (2010)
 Deputy Commander of the Naval Command and Staff College (2010)
 Pankolinlamil (2012)
 Pangarmatim(2014)
 Kalakhar Bakorkamla (2014)

See also 

 Indonesian military ranks

References 

1957 births
Living people
Indonesian admirals
People from Bojonegoro Regency
Chiefs of Staff of the Indonesian Navy